Harry Griffith may refer to:

Harry Earl Griffith, newspaper publisher
Harry Devonald Griffith (1898–1964), British physicist and author
Harry Griffith (coach), see 1st Grey Cup
Harry Griffith (actor) in Catch My Smoke

See also
Henry Griffith (disambiguation)
Harold Griffith (1894–1985), Canadian anesthesiologist
Harold Griffith (Australian cricketer) (1879–1947), Australian cricketer
Harold Griffith (Barbadian cricketer) (1921–2004), Barbadian cricketer